The 2017 NCAA Division I softball tournament was held from May 18 through June 7, 2017, as the final part of the 2017 NCAA Division I softball season. The 64 participating NCAA Division I college softball teams were selected out of an eligible 293 teams on May 14, 2017. Thirty-two teams were awarded automatic bids as champions of their conferences, and the remaining 32 were selected at-large by the NCAA Division I softball selection committee. The tournament culminated with eight teams playing in the 2017 Women's College World Series at ASA Hall of Fame Stadium in Oklahoma City. Oklahoma would repeat as National Champions, defeating Florida in 2 games and 17 innings in the first game. Oklahoma became the lowest seeded team to ever win the National Championship, winning as the 10 seed.

Automatic bids
The Big West, Mountain West, Pac-12, and West Coast Conference bids were awarded to the regular-season champion. All other conferences have the automatic bid go to the conference tournament winner.

National seeds
16 National Seeds were announced on the Selection Show Sunday, May 14 at 10 p.m. EDT on ESPN2. The 16 national seeds host the Regionals. Teams in italics advanced to Super Regionals. Teams in bold advance to Women's College World Series.

1. 

2. 

3. 

4. 

5. 

6. 

7. Auburn

8. 

9. 

10. Oklahoma

11. 

12. 

13. 

14. 

15. 

16. Alabama

Regionals and Super Regionals
The Regionals took place May 18–21. One regional, Salt Lake City, took place May 18–20 because of BYU's no-Sunday-play policy; all other regionals occurred May 19–21. The Super Regionals took place from May 25–28.

Gainesville Super Regional

Knoxville Super Regional

Los Angeles Super Regional

Tallahassee Super Regional

Eugene Super Regional

Seattle Super Regional

Auburn Super Regional

Tucson Super Regional

Women's College World Series
The Women's College World Series will be held June 1 through June 7, 2017, in Oklahoma City.

Participants 

† = From NCAA Division I Softball Championship Results

Bracket

Game results

Championship game

All-tournament Team
The following players were members of the Women's College World Series All-Tournament Team.

Record by conference

The columns RF, SR, WS, NS, F, and NC respectively stand for the Regional Finals, Super Regionals, College World Series Teams, National Semi-Finals, Finals, and National Champion.

Media coverage

Radio
Westwood One provided nationwide radio coverage of the championship series. It was streamed online at westwoodsports.com, through TuneIn, and on SiriusXM. Kevin Kugler and Leah Amico provided the call for Westwood One.

Television
ESPN holds exclusive rights to the tournament. They aired games across ESPN, ESPN2, ESPNU, SEC Network, ESPN3 and Longhorn Network. For the first time in the history of the women's softball tournament ESPN covered every regional.

Broadcast assignments

Regionals
Salt Lake: Alex Perlman & Megan Turk
Gainesville: Melissa Lee & Lee Dakich
Lexington: Jenn Hildreth & Carol Bruggeman
Norman: Alex Loeb & Megan Willis
Baton Rouge: Lyn Rollins & Yvette Girouard
Knoxville: Lisa Byington & Jennie Ritter
Auburn: Mark Neely & Jenny Dalton-Hill
Tuscaloosa: Pam Ward & Cheri Kempf
Super Regionals
Gainesville: Eric Collins & Amanda Scarborough
Los Angeles: Beth Mowins, Jessica Mendoza, Michele Smith, & Holly Rowe
Auburn: Mark Neely & Jenny Dalton-Hill
Tallahassee: Jenn Hildreth & Carol Bruggeman
Women's College World Series
Adam Amin, Amanda Scarborough, & Laura Rutledge (afternoons, early Fri)
Beth Mowins, Jessica Mendoza, Michele Smith, & Holly Rowe (evenings minus early Fri)

Regionals
Tallahassee: Eric Frede & Leah Amico
Waco: Brenda VanLengen & Francesca Enea
College Station: Tyler Denning & Erin Miller
Oxford: Eric Collins & Amanda Scarborough
Tucson: Dean Linke & Kenzie Fowler
Eugene: Trey Bender & Danielle Lawrie
Los Angeles: Tracy Warren & Amanda Freed
Seattle: Beth Mowins & Michele Smith
Super Regionals
Knoxville: Alex Loeb & Megan Willis
Eugene: Trey Bender & Danielle Lawrie
Tucson: Pam Ward & Cheri Kempf
Seattle: Courtney Lyle & Lee Dakich
Women's College World Series Finals
Beth Mowins, Jessica Mendoza, Michele Smith, & Holly Rowe

References

NCAA Division I softball tournament
Tournament